The 7th Armored Division ("Lucky Seventh") was an armored division of the United States Army that saw distinguished service on the Western Front, from August 1944 until May 1945, during World War II.

History
The division was activated on 1 March 1942 out of "surplus" elements of the reorganized 3rd and 5th Armored Divisions, and itself reorganized on 20 September 1943. The 7th Armored Division trained at Camp Coxcomb in California. The 7th Armored Division arrived in England in June 1944. Throughout most of its existence the 7th Armored Division was commanded by Major General Lindsay McDonald Silvester, an infantryman who had distinguished himself in World War I.

Composition 
The division was composed of the following units:

 Headquarters
 Headquarters Company
 Combat Command A
 Combat Command B
 Combat Command Reserve
 17th Tank Battalion
 31st Tank Battalion
 40th Tank Battalion
 23rd Armored Infantry Battalion
 38th Armored Infantry Battalion
 48th Armored Infantry Battalion
 Headquarters and Headquarters Battery, 7th Armored Division Artillery
 434th Armored Field Artillery Battalion
 440th Armored Field Artillery Battalion
 489th Armored Field Artillery Battalion
 87th Cavalry Reconnaissance Squadron (Mechanized)
 33rd Armored Engineer Battalion
 147th Armored Signal Company
 Headquarters and Headquarters Company, 7th Armored Division Trains
 129th Armored Ordnance Maintenance Battalion
 77th Armored Medical Battalion
 Military Police Platoon
 Band

Action in France
The 7th Armored Division landed on Omaha and Utah Beaches, 13–14 August 1944, and was assigned to U.S. Third Army, commanded by Lieutenant General George S. Patton. The division drove through Nogent-le-Rotrou in an attack on Chartres. The city fell on 18 August. From Chartres, the division advanced to liberate Dreux and then Melun, where they crossed the Seine River, 24 August. The division then pushed on to bypass Reims and liberate Château-Thierry and then Verdun, 31 August.

The 7th Armored halted briefly for refueling and then on 6 September drove on toward the Moselle and made a crossing near Dornot. This crossing had to be withdrawn in the face of the heavy fortifications around Metz. The 7th Armored then made attempts to cross the Moselle northwest of Metz but the deep river valley was not suitable terrain for an armored attack. Elements of the division assisted the 5th Infantry Division in expanding a bridgehead east of Arnaville, south of Metz, and on 15 September, the main part of the division crossed the Moselle there. The 7th Armored Division was repulsed in its attacks across the Seille River at and near Sillegny, part of an attack in conjunction with the 5th Infantry division that was also repulsed further north.

Support of Operation Market Garden
On 25 September 1944, the 7th Armored Division was transferred to the U.S. Ninth Army, under Lieutenant General William Hood Simpson, and began the march to the Netherlands where they were needed to protect the right (east) flank of the corridor opened by Operation Market Garden. They were to operate in the southeast Netherlands, so that British and Canadian forces and the 104th Infantry Division could clear the Germans from the Scheldt Estuary in the southwest Netherlands and open the shipping lanes to the critical port of Antwerp, to allow Allied ships to bring supplies from Britain.

On 30 September, the 7th Armored Division launched an attack from the north on the town of Overloon, against significant German defenses. The attacks progressed slowly and finally settled into a series of counter-attacks reminiscent of trench warfare of World War I. On 8 October, the division was relieved from the attack on Overloon by the British 11th Armoured Division and moved south of Overloon to the Deurne–Weert area. Here they were attached to the British Second Army, under Lieutenant General Sir Miles C. Dempsey, and ordered to make demonstration attacks to the east, in order to divert enemy forces from the Overloon and Venlo areas, where British troops pressed the attack. This plan succeeded, and the British were finally able to liberate Overloon.

On 27 October 1944, the main part of the 7th Armored Division was in essentially defensive positions along the line Nederweert (and south) to Meijel to Liesel, with the demonstration force still in the attack across the Deurne canal to the east. The Germans launched a two-division offensive centered on Meijel, catching the thinly stretched 87th Cavalry Reconnaissance Squadron of the 7th Armored Division by surprise. However, the response by the 7th Armored and by British Lieutenant General Sir Richard O'Connor's British VIII Corps, to which the division was attached, stopped the German attack on the third day and then from 31 October to 8 November gradually drove the enemy out of the terrain that they had taken. During this operation, at midnight on the night of 31 October–1 November Major General Lindsay Silvester, who had led the division since its activation, was relieved as commander of the division and replaced by Major General Robert W. Hasbrouck.

Refit and retraining
On 8 November 1944, the 7th Armored was again transferred to the Ninth Army and moved south to rest areas at and east of Maastricht. Following an inflow of many replacements, they began extensive training and reorganization, since so many original men had been lost in France and the Netherlands that a significant part of the division was now men who had never trained together. At the end of November, the division straddled the Dutch-German border with one combat command in Germany (in the area of Ubach, north of Aachen) and two in the Netherlands.

Elements of the division were attached to the 84th Infantry Division for operations in early December in the area of Linnich, Germany, on the banks of the Rur (Roer). The 7th was preparing to drive into Germany when the Ardennes offensive began on 16 December 1944.

Battle of the Bulge
The division was transferred to the U.S. First Army, under Lieutenant General Courtney Hodges, and ordered to St. Vith, Belgium, a critical road and rail center needed by the Germans to supply their offensive. Over the course of almost a week, the 7th Armored (along with elements of the 106th, the 28th Infantry Division and 9th Armored Divisions) absorbed much of the weight of the German drive, throwing the German time table into great disarray, before being forced to withdraw west of the Salm River on 23 December. The division moved to the area of Manhay, Belgium, and by the end of December had cleared the town of the enemy. They were then relieved by the 75th Infantry Division. After a brief rest in January 1945, the division returned to positions near St. Vith, attacked, and re-captured the town on 23 January 1945.

Movement into Germany
In February 1945, now attached to the U.S. First Army's V Corps, the division returned to Germany. In the first week of the month, Combat Command R was attached to 78th Infantry Division for attacks on Strauch, Simmerath, Steckenborn, and other towns in the area of the Huertgen Forest. The Division remained in the area of Steckenborn, Germany throughout the month, waiting for the flood waters to recede after the Germans destroyed major dams in the Allies' path. However, large contingents of men were sent back into Belgium and attached to Engineer Combat Battalions (e.g. most of the men of 38 AIB were attached to 1110 Engineers at Stavelot) from 12 to 27 February, for use as laborers in using logs to build a solid base for the torn-up roads through the Ardennes Forest.

In March 1945, the 7th Armored took part in two major breakthroughs with a two-week period during which they established and maintained an important defensive position. The first breakthrough came early in March when the division, as part of the III Corps, pushed east from the Rur river to establish a defensive position along the west bank of the Rhine, south of Bonn to Unkelbach. The second major breakthrough began 26 March when the division, still under III Corps control, took part in an armored offensive intended to break the thin crust ringing the Remagen bridgehead and overrun the rich German farmland to the east and north and surround the Ruhr Pocket in a double envelopment.

In April, the 7th Armored Division completed their part of the encirclement of the Ruhr Pocket and captured the critical Edersee Dam. They then attacked into the Ruhr Pocket, in order to reduce it. On 16 April the LIII Panzer Corps surrendered to the division and the eastern sector of the pocket collapsed. The 7th Armored, after a brief rest, were then transferred once again to the British Second Army and moved north to the Baltic Sea. From this area, Lieutenant William A. Knowlton led a force eastward to make contact with the Red Army. The 7th Armored Division remained in this area until the war in Europe ended.

Casualties
 Total battle casualties: 5,799
 Killed in action: 898
 Wounded in action: 3,811
 Missing in action: 165
 Prisoner of war: 925

Occupation duty
The division was then moved into the future Soviet zone of occupation, at Dessau, Germany. President Truman wanted one of his armored divisions parading in front of him on the 4 July in Berlin, and 2nd and 7th Armored were both prepared for the honor. When the 2nd Armored was chosen for the parade, 7th Armored immediately moved southwest to the future American zone of occupation.

The division then began to be gradually filled with more and more new faces, as the veterans were transferred elsewhere. The first large contingent of veterans left in mid July: these were low-point men who were headed back to the United States to begin training for the invasion of Japan. Other large groups of high-point men were transferred to other units that were going back home before the 7th Armored Division was inactivated.

Inactivation
The division returned to New York and was inactivated on 11 October 1945.

Achievements
During its service in World War II, the 7th Armored Division captured and destroyed a disproportionate number of enemy vehicles and took more than 100,000 prisoners.

Enemy vehicles destroyed and prisoners captured
 Armored vehicles destroyed: 621;
 Armored vehicles captured: 89;
 Miscellaneous vehicles destroyed: 2,653;
 Miscellaneous vehicles captured: 3,517;
 Armament destroyed: 583 pieces;
 Armament captured (only pieces larger than 50mm included): 361;
 Prisoners taken: 113,041.

Division statistics
 Distance travelled ;
 Gasoline consumed 
 Ammunition expended
 105mm: 350,027 rounds
 76mm: 19,209 rounds
 75mm: 48,724 rounds
 .50cal: 1,267,128 rounds
 .45cal: 540,523 rounds
 .30cal: 9,367,966 rounds

Decorations awarded
 Medal of Honor: 2
 Distinguished Service Cross: 9
 Silver Star Medal: 351
 Bronze Star Medal: 888
 Meritorious Service Medal: 1,047
 Purple Hearts: 1,211
 Presidential Unit Citation: 1

Korean War activation
The division was reactivated in the early 1950s, but was not sent to Korea. It was stationed at Camp Roberts, California for the duration of the conflict.

References

External links
 7th Armored Division Association
 7th Armored Division Document Repository
 7th Armored Division Troops in the Battle at Baraque de Fraiture, Belgium ("Parker's Crossroads") 20–23 December 1944
 US Non-Airborne Troops in Holland in World War II
 87th Cavalry Squadron Reconn
 Lucky Seventh – The Netherlands
 Fact Sheet of the 7th Armored Division WARNING: the information on this link is extremely flawed: the units listed are not at all the units of the 7th Armored Division, and the purported history of the division has major gaps and errors

07th Armored Division, U.S.
Armored Division, U.S. 07th
Military units and formations established in 1942
1942 establishments in the United States
Military units and formations disestablished in 1953